Acer Aspire (stylised as Λspire or ΛSPIRE) is a series of personal computers by Acer Inc. aimed at casual household users. The Aspire series covers both desktop computers and laptops. Acer developed the series to range from essentials to high performance. The Aspire mainly competes against computers such as Asus' Transformer Book Flip, VivoBook and Zenbook, Dell's Inspiron and XPS, HP's Pavilion, Spectre, Stream and Envy, Lenovo's IdeaPad, Samsung's Sens and Toshiba's Satellite.

The Aspire series was first brought to the market in 1999 when the Aspire 1151 was introduced and featured a 200 MHz Intel Pentium. The Aspire series then replaced the AcerPower series in 2002 and became one of Acer's main series.

Switch tablets 
Acer Aspire Switch is a series of two-in-one tablet computers running Windows 8, with a tablet and detachable keyboard sold together.

List of Acer Aspire Switch Models 

SW3-013
SW3-013P
SW3-016
SW3-016P
SW5-011
SW5-012
SW5-012P
SW5-014
SW5-014P
SW5-015
SW5-111
SW5-111P
SW5-171
SW5-171P
SW5-173
SW5-173P
SW5-271
SW7-272
SW7-272P

Switch 10
Acer Aspire Switch 10 was announced in April 2014. It is a 10.1-inch two-in-one, with a  resolution display and Intel Atom Z3745 processor.

Switch 11
Acer Aspire Switch 11 was announced in September 2014, as a larger 11.6-inch version, that was planned for release in November. There are two models of the Acer Aspire Switch 11: The Acer Aspire Switch 11 SW5-111 with an Intel Atom Z3735 processor, 2GB RAM, and a  resolution display, and the Acer Aspire Switch 11 SW5-171 with an Intel Core i3 processor, 4GB RAM, and a  resolution display.

Laptop models

Acer Markets their Aspire laptops under many different sub series such as Aspire E series, Aspire F series, Aspire M series, Aspire P series, Aspire R series, Aspire S series, Aspire V Nitro series, Aspire V series and Aspire VX series.

All-in-Ones models

List of Acer Aspire All-in-Ones Models 

5600U
5920G
7600U
A3-600
C20-220 Elxan
C20-720
C22-720
C22-760
C22-860
C24-760
C24-865
C24-963
U27-880
U5-610
U5-620 
U5-710
Z1100
Z1110
Z1-211
Z1220
Z1-601
Z1-602
Z1-611
Z1-612
Z1620
Z1-621
Z1-621G
Z1-622
Z1-623
Z1650
Z1-751
Z1-752
Z1800
Z1801
Z1810
Z1811
Z1850
Z20-730
Z20-780
Z22-780
Z24-880
Z3100
Z3101
Z3-105
Z3-115
Z3170
Z3171
Z3280
Z3-600
Z3-601
Z3-605
Z3-610
Z3-613
Z3-615
Z3620
Z3-700
Z3-705
Z3-710
Z3-711
Z3-715
Z3730
Z3731
Z3760
Z3761
Z3770
Z3771
Z3800
Z3801
Z5101
Z5600
Z5610
Z5700
Z5710
Z5730
Z5751
Z5760
Z5761
Z5770
Z5771
Z5801
ZC-102
ZC-105
ZC-106
ZC-107
ZC-602
ZC-605
ZC-606
ZC-610
ZC-700
ZC-700G
ZS600
ZS600G
5100 series

Desktop models

Aspire is a series of personal computers by Acer Inc. aimed at the casual household user or for small business use. The Aspire series covers both desktop computers and laptops. Acer developed the series in order to cover from essentials to high performances.

The AcerPower S series was replaced by the Aspire desktop series in 2002. The AcerPower S Series consisted of two types: the AcerPower Se Series and the AcerPower Sn Series desktop. As of July 2019 Acer offers three desktop Aspire model lines.

References

External links

 

Aspire
Aspire
Consumer electronics brands
Ultrabooks